Nicholas Proude  was a Church of Ireland priest in Ireland during the seventeenth century.

Proude was educated at St John's College, Cambridge. He graduated BA in 1629 and MA in 1632. He held livings at Ballysheehan, Killenaule and Ballingarry He was appointed Archdeacon of Cashel in 1640  and Dean of Clonfert in 1666;  and held both offices until his death in 1669.

References

Archdeacons of Cashel
Deans of Clonfert
1669 deaths
Year of birth unknown
Alumni of St John's College, Cambridge
17th-century Irish Anglican priests